Edward J. Coughlin (July 25, 1885 – October 10, 1945) was an American civil engineer and politician from New York.

Life
He attended the public schools and St. Patrick's Academy in Troy, Albany Business College, the City College of New York, and Heffley Institute in Brooklyn. During World War I, he served with the American Expeditionary Forces in France as a sergeant first class. He married Minnie B. (1892–1975).

Coughlin was a member of the New York State Assembly (Kings Co., 11th D.) in 1923, 1924, 1925, 1926, 1927, 1928, 1929, 1930, 1931, 1932, 1933 and 1934. On April 14, 1930, he was hurt in an airplane wreck in Albany.

He was a member of the New York State Senate (6th D.) from 1935 to 1944, sitting in the 158th, 159th, 160th, 161st, 162nd, 163rd and 164th New York State Legislatures. On February 21, 1941, he was badly injured when he fell down a stairway and crashed through a glass door.

He died on October 10, 1945, in Veterans Hospital in the Bronx; and was buried at the Cypress Hills National Cemetery in Brooklyn.

Sources

External links
 Edward J. Coughlin at Locate Grave
 

1885 births
1945 deaths
Democratic Party New York (state) state senators
Politicians from Brooklyn
Democratic Party members of the New York State Assembly
City College of New York alumni
United States Army officers
20th-century American politicians
Albany Business College alumni